Timora diarhoda is a species of moth of the family Noctuidae first described by George Hampson in 1909. It is found in Africa, including South Africa.

External links
 

Endemic moths of South Africa
Heliothinae